Albert Palmer (January 17, 1831 – May 21, 1887) was an American schoolteacher, businessman, and politician from Candia New Hampshire, and Boston, Massachusetts, who served as mayor of Boston from January 1, 1883, to January 7, 1884.

Early life 
Palmer was born in Candia, New Hampshire, he was the seventh of eleven children born to Joseph and Abigail Palmer.

Education 
Palmer graduated from Phillips Exeter, and from Dartmouth College in 1858.

Family life 
Palmer married Martha Ann Newell, they had two children Joseph Newell Palmer, born January 1, 1865 and Wilson Newell Palmer, born July 7,  1867.

Teaching career 
Palmer taught at the Boston Latin School, and in the schools of West Cambridge, Massachusetts.

Business career 
After he left teaching Palmer was engaged in the ice business in Boston with Nathan B. Prescott. under the name Prescott and Palmer.  In 1872 the Jamaica Pond Ice Company was formed from the amalgamation of the Prescott and Palmer Ice Company and three other firms.  Palmer served as the treasure and later president of the Jamaica Pond Ice Company.

1881 campaign for Mayor
In  the 1881 mayoral election Palmer was defeated by Dr. Samuel A. Green.

1882 election as Mayor 
In the Boston city election held on December 12, 1882, Palmer was elected Mayor, with a majority of 2,187 votes over Dr. Samuel A. Green, the candidate of the Republican and Citizens parties.

See also
 1872 Massachusetts legislature
 1873 Massachusetts legislature
 1874 Massachusetts legislature
 1875 Massachusetts legislature
 1876 Massachusetts legislature
 1878 Massachusetts legislature
 Timeline of Boston, 1880s

References 
 Lund, Joseph W.:, Seventh Report of the Class of 1890 of Harvard College 1920 Thirtieth Anniversary, Concord, New Hampshire: The Rumford Press, p. 126, (1921).
 Mayors of Boston: An Illustrated Epitome of who the Mayors Have Been and What they Have Done, Boston, MA: State Street Trust Company, Page 37, (1914).
 Palmer, Wilson:, Reminiscences of Candia, Cambridge, Massachusetts: Riverside Press, p. 2 (1905).

End notes

External links
 Political Graveyard information on Albert Palmer
Mayor Albert Palmer Served 1883

1831 births
1887 deaths
People from Candia, New Hampshire
Massachusetts Republicans
Massachusetts Democrats
Massachusetts state senators
Dartmouth College alumni
Mayors of Boston
Members of the Massachusetts House of Representatives
Ice trade
19th-century American politicians